France competed at the 1998 Winter Paralympics in Nagano, Japan. 25 competitors from France won 22 medals, including 5 gold, 9 silver and 8 bronze and finished 10th in the medal table.

See also 
 France at the Paralympics
 France at the 1998 Winter Olympics

References 

France at the Paralympics
1998 in French sport
Nations at the 1998 Winter Paralympics